Roy William Tunks (born 21 January 1951) is a German-born English former professional footballer who played as a goalkeeper. He made over 850 appearances in a playing career spanning over twenty years.

He was signed for a record fee by Preston North End in 1974 as a goalkeeper from Rotherham United where he was known as the "boy with the golden gloves". He played well over 300 games for Preston North End, and was the club's Player of the Year for the 1979–80 season.

He moved to Wigan Athletic in 1981, and was part of the team that won the Associate Members' Cup in 1985.

After retiring in 1990, Tunks moved into coaching. He joined the FA and worked with England youngsters at under 16 to under 20 level. He also worked at Premier League clubs Blackburn Rovers and Newcastle United as a goalkeeping coach. He was part of the backroom staff at Tranmere Rovers before moving on to become head of Goalkeeping Department at Manchester City F.C

References

External links
 

Living people
1951 births
Sportspeople from Wuppertal
English footballers
Association football goalkeepers
English Football League players
Rotherham United F.C. players
York City F.C. players
Preston North End F.C. players
Wigan Athletic F.C. players
Hartlepool United F.C. players
Preston North End F.C. non-playing staff
Wigan Athletic F.C. non-playing staff
Newcastle United F.C. non-playing staff
Blackburn Rovers F.C. non-playing staff
Footballers from North Rhine-Westphalia